Epsom is a town in Surrey, England.  Related to that are:
Epsom railway station, serving Epsom
Epsom College, an independent school in Epsom
 Epsom Downs, an area of chalk upland near Epsom
Epsom Downs Racecourse, on Epsom Downs
Epsom Derby, a prestigious horse race run on Epsom Downs Racecourse
Epsom Oaks, another horse race run on Epsom Downs Racecourse
Epsom Downs (play), set on Epsom Derby day
Epsom Downs railway station, serving Epsom Downs
Epsom salts (magnesium sulphate), named for a saline spring in Epsom
Epsom and Ewell, the borough including Epsom
Epsom riot, a disturbance by Canadian soldiers in 1919
Epsom Wells, a play written by Thomas Shadwell in 1673

Other places

Australia 
 Epsom, Queensland, a locality in the Isaac Region
 Epsom, Victoria, Australia
 Epsom Handicap, a Group 1 Australian Thoroughbred horse race run at Randwick Racecourse, Sydney

New Zealand 
 Epsom (New Zealand electorate)
 Epsom, New Zealand

United States 
Epsom, Indiana, United States
Epsom, New Hampshire, United States

Other uses
 Operation Epsom, the British attempt of the capture of Caen

See also 
 Epson, a Japanese electronics company